Mount Etna is an active volcano on the east coast of Sicily.

Etna or ETNA may also refer to:

Places

United States
Etna, California, a city
Etna, Georgia, a village
Etna, Illinois, an unincorporated community
Etna, Indiana, an unincorporated town
Etna, Kentucky, an unincorporated community
Etna, Maine, a town
Etna, Minnesota, an unincorporated community
Etna, Missouri, an unincorporated community
Etna, Nebraska, an unincorporated community
Etna, Lincoln County, Nevada, a ghost town
Etna, Pershing County, Nevada, a former townsite
Etna, New Hampshire, a village
Emerson, New Jersey, a borough originally named the Borough of Etna
Etna, New York, an unincorporated community
Etna, Lawrence County, Ohio, an unincorporated community
Etna Township, Licking County, Ohio
Etna, Licking County, Ohio, an unincorporated community
Etna, Oklahoma, an unincorporated community
Etna, Pennsylvania, a borough
Whiteside, Tennessee, an unincorporated community formerly named Etna
Etna, Texas, a ghost town
Etna, Washington, an unincorporated community
Etna, Wisconsin, an unincorporated community
Etna, Wyoming, a census-designated place

Elsewhere
Etna (river), in the traditional district of Valdres, Norway
Etna Island, off the northeastern tip of the Antarctic Peninsula
11249 Etna, an asteroid
Mount Etna, Queensland, a Mountain and a National Park in Australia

Ships
HMS Aetna, a list of ships including those named Etna
Etna-class corvette, six sailing ships of the French Navy
Etna-class cruiser, four ships built for the Royal Italian Navy in the late 1880s
Etna-class cruiser (1941), two ships ordered in Italy for the Royal Thai Navy in 1938, but never completed
Etna-class replenishment oiler, one ship built for Italy and one ship for Greece
Italian ship Etna (A 5326), the Italian Navy lead ship of the replenishment oiler class
Italian ship Etna (A 5328), an attack cargo ship, originally built for the United States

Other uses
École des technologies numériques appliquées, a French private university in computer science
Etna DOC, an Italian wine region designation
Etna (Disgaea), a main character in the Disgaea series of console role playing games
Etna Iron Works, a New York marine engine manufacturer active during the American Civil War
Lotus Etna, a one-off concept car
Etna, a steam locomotive of the Carmarthen and Cardigan Railway in Wales
LG KS360, LG Etna, also known as LG KS360, a mobile phone model
Obsolete name for the Bunsen burner or spirit lamp

See also
Aetna (disambiguation)
Mount Aetna (disambiguation)